Foesum is an American hip hop group whose members included T-Dubb, MNMsta and DJ Glaze. They recorded an album on Penalty/Tommy Boy Records called Perfection, released on October 22, 1996.

History
In 1986, DJ Glaze and MNM created a DJ crew called Perfection and recruited members from their local high school in Long Beach. During the next three years Perfection performed at a number of school dances and parties in the town. By 1989, Perfection had recruited almost a dozen members. Towards the end of Perfection's senior year, they decided to produce their own record. Travvy Trav, one of the older members of the group, searched for the "dopest" MC in Long Beach and found Domino, who attended Millikan High School. Perfection recruited Domino and bought a Roland 808 drum machine to start making demos in the garage with the intention of securing a record deal. Dozens of songs were recorded and members Tender D and Mellow D (now known as The Twinz) were brought into the group by T-Dubb and Travvy Trav, who are first cousins. After many disappointments and some personality conflicts, Domino left the group to fend for themselves. This sparked a collaboration with another Long Beach Eastsider Snoop Doggy Dogg called "Let 'Em Understand Perfection" on a compilation album called Please Pass The Mic which was a "diss" track aimed at Domino. This explains one of the lines by Snoop in Dr. Dre's "Nuthin' but a 'G' Thang", "Perfection is perfected, so I let 'em understand".

In 1991, Perfection met Big Wes and Suge Knight who were then bodyguards for New Edition. Big Wes was planning his own label, Lockdown Records, and took an interest in the group. After a few months, the name Perfection was dropped and Foesum was born. Foesum (slang for "foursome") had more street appeal and consisted of four members: T-Dubb, Wayniac, MNM and DJ Glaze. Foesum recorded an entire underground album at Solar Records, home of legendary groups like Lakeside, the Whispers and Babyface. Songs that were recorded but not released included "Ridin' High" (re-recorded on the Twinz album), "Point of No Return", "Knick Knack Patty Wack" ,"Ain't No Fun" (featuring Kid Frost), "Much Love" and MNM's "Chrome To The Dome". With little possibility of a record deal, Foesum  was inactive for about a year, but, in 1992, Wayniac was approached by Warren G who needed help writing his album Regulate...G Funk Era. Eventually, Wayniac teamed up with his brother Trip Locc as The Twinz, signing a record deal on Def Jam Records. In the meantime, Glaze, MNM and T-Dubb carried on the group themselves. They decided to keep the name and to make Travvy Trav (who died from a heart problem during the struggle) as the silent fourth member.

In 1994, Foesum joined Tony G and Julio G of the original 1580 AM KDAY Mixmasters. Ruthless Records' CEO, Eazy-E, asked Julio G to co-host The Ruthless Radio Show on 92.3 The Beat in Los Angeles. In just a few weeks and with Tony G's help, Foesum recorded "Lil Somethin' Somethin'" and "Listen To The Sound". It caught the ear of Eazy E and the hip hop entrepreneur Kevin Mitchell in New York who was able to make deals with Big Beat/Atlantic and Tommy Boy Records. Foesum eventually signed a deal with Atlantic Records in January 1995. The first single, "Lil Somethin' Somethin'" was released in summer 1995 on Big Beat/Atlantic Records and received major play on the video show The Box and radio stations. The album, Perfection, was released on Penalty Records/Tommy Boy in fall 1996. Since then, Foesum has worked on new albums to release on their own independent venture called The Perfection Label including The FoeFathers, a greatest hits album, and solo projects.

Discography

Solo albums
 2002 : DJ Glaze – "Ultimate Collaborations" (compilation)
 2004 : MNMsta – "Walk In My Shoez"
 2007 : MNMsta – "Here For A Reason"
 2011 : MNMsta – "Unbreakable"

Compilations
 2004 : The Greatest Hits Volume One
 2011 : The Greatest Hits Volume Two
 2016 : The Greatest Hits Volume 3

References

Hip hop groups from California
Musicians from Long Beach, California
Musical groups from Los Angeles
Gangsta rap groups
G-funk groups